Enzo Petriglia (born 27 September 1946) is a retired Italian lightweight boxer who won a bronze medal at the 1967 Mediterranean Games. Next year he competed at the Mexico Olympics, but was eliminated in the fourth round by the eventual silver medalist Józef Grudzień. After the Olympics he turned professional, and won a national title in 1971. He unsuccessfully contested the European (EBU) lightweight title in 1972, and retired in 1974.

References

1946 births
Living people
Lightweight boxers
Italian male boxers
Boxers at the 1968 Summer Olympics
Olympic boxers of Italy

Mediterranean Games bronze medalists for Italy
Competitors at the 1967 Mediterranean Games
Mediterranean Games medalists in boxing
20th-century Italian people